Miryam Maritza Núñez Padilla (born 10 August 1994) is an Ecuadorian professional racing cyclist, who rides for UCI Women's Continental Team . She rode in the women's road race at the 2015 UCI Road World Championships.

She won both the time trial and the road race at the 2019 Ecuadorian National Road Championships, and repeated the double in 2021 as the Championships were not held in 2020.

Major results
Source: 

2015
 1st  Time trial, National Road Championships
 9th Time trial, Pan American Road Championships
2016
 5th Copa Federación Venezolana de Ciclismo
2017
 Bolivarian Games
3rd  Omnium
3rd  Points race
 9th Time trial, Pan American Road Championships
2018
 3rd  Time trial, South American Games
 6th Time trial, Pan American Road Championships
 7th Overall Vuelta a Colombia Femenina
 7th Gran Premio Comite Olimpico Nacional Femenino
 8th Overall Vuelta Internacional Femenina a Costa Rica
2019
 National Road Championships
1st  Road race
1st  Time trial
 5th Overall Vuelta Femenina a Guatemala
1st Mountains classification
 7th Time trial, Pan American Road Championships
2020
 1st  Overall Vuelta a Colombia Femenina
2021
 National Road Championships
1st  Road race
1st  Time trial
 2nd Overall Vuelta Femenina a Guatemala
 3rd  Madison, Pan American Track Championships (with Dayana Aguilar)
 3rd Overall Vuelta a Colombia Femenina
1st Stage 6
 4th Time trial, Pan American Road Championships
2022
 Bolivarian Games
1st  Time trial
2nd  Road race
 National Mountain Bike Championships
1st  Cross-country
1st  Cross-country eliminator
2nd Cross-country short track
2023
 National Road Championships
1st  Time Trial

References

External links

1994 births
Living people
Ecuadorian female cyclists
Place of birth missing (living people)
Cyclists at the 2015 Pan American Games
Cyclists at the 2019 Pan American Games
Pan American Games competitors for Ecuador
21st-century Ecuadorian women